Sir John Constable (1526–1579), of Burton Constable and Halsham, Yorkshire, was an English Member of Parliament for Hedon March 1553, October 1553, 1558 and 1563, and possibly for Yorkshire in 1555.

References

1526 births
1579 deaths
Members of the Parliament of England for Hedon
English MPs 1553 (Edward VI)
English MPs 1553 (Mary I)
English MPs 1558
English MPs 1563–1567
English MPs 1555